Doctor John Dickson was a politician in colonial New South Wales, a member of the New South Wales Legislative Council and Representative of the Government in the Legislative Council.

Dickson studied medicine at the University of Edinburgh in 1830.

References

 

Australian pastoralists
Members of the New South Wales Legislative Council
Scottish emigrants to colonial Australia
Alumni of the University of Edinburgh
Year of birth unknown
Year of death unknown